Europe Begins at Sarajevo was a short-lived pan-European political party established in France to contest the 1994 European Parliament elections on a campaign of support for the people of Bosnia (especially Sarajevo), and their multiracialist ideals.

History

Europe Begins at Sarajevo was established in France in 1994 in reaction to the Yugoslav Wars. It carried strong anti-nationalist and pan-European sentiments. The party was established under the direction of the French philosopher Bernard-Henri Lévy, who visited the siege of Sarajevo in 1992 and was disturbed by what he saw. Upon returning to Paris, he delivered a plea for aid from the Bosnian President Alija Izetbegović directly to the French President François Mitterrand. The letter may have helped to spur Mitterrand's surprise visit to besieged Sarajevo in June 1992.

As the siege continued, Lévy became increasingly frustrated with Mitterrand's refusal to lift the arms embargo on Bosnia, and founded the party in protest. Initial opinion polls showed the party polling at 12%, drawing votes from the centre left Parti Socialiste. However, shortly before the election, on 30 May, Levy announced that he was withdrawing from the race, claiming that he had achieved his goal of increasing awareness. In the final tally, the list only received 1.5% of votes.

Legacy

References

Pan-European political parties
Anti-nationalism in Europe